Swaran Lata (born 19 November 1938), or Swaranlata is a former Punjabi singer of Indian Punjab.
 She is known for her songs like Lai De Maye Kaalean Baagan Di Mehndi, Munh Vich Bhabi De, Nand Burkiaan Pave. She sang almost every Punjabi singer of her time, including Harcharan Garewal, Karamjit Dhuri, Karnail Gill, Muhammad Sadiq, Didar Sandhu, Gurcharan Pohli, Ramesh Rangila, Jagat Singh Jagga, Daleep Singh Deep and Mahendra Kapoor. Most of her recording is found with Karamjit Dhuri with whom she performed in live shows for the longest time as well.

Due to the political situations in Punjab, she stop doing live shows in 1988 and her last performance was at Dhillwan.

References 

Punjabi-language singers
Living people
1938 births
Indian women folk singers
Indian folk singers
Women musicians from Punjab, India
Singers from Punjab, India
20th-century Indian singers
20th-century Indian women singers